Ōryōki, is a transliteration of Sanskrit , also called 應量器, means "vessel that contains just enough" is a set of nested bowls and other eating utensils for the personal use of Buddhist monks. Ōryōki also refers to a meditative form of eating using these utensils that originated in Japan and emphasizes mindfulness awareness practice by abiding to a strict order of precise movements.

The term  "ōryōki" is mostly used in the  sect of Zen Buddhism. Jihatsu is also used to refer to the bowls alone 

The bowls usually made of lacquered wood, and utensils all bundled in a cloth. The largest bowl, sometimes called the Buddha Bowl or zuhatsu, symbolizes Buddha's head and his wisdom. The other bowls are progressively smaller. In describing the form of ōryōki used at John Daido Loori's Zen Mountain Monastery, author Jack Maguire wrote:

This is the formal style of serving and eating meals practiced in Zen temples.

Buddhist tradition states that after Huineng received the monk's robe and bowl as evidence of his having received Dharma transmission, the bowl itself was considered a symbol of transmission from teacher to student.

Ōryōki have evolved in vihāra in East Asia over many years and are part of the Buddhist tradition that has now been transmitted to the West. Both monks and laypeople use ōryōki to eat formal meals in Zen monasteries and places of practice. A lineage was also transmitted from Kōbun Chino Otogawa to the Tibetan Buddhist sangha of Chögyam Trungpa and is now practiced at all Shambhala International retreat centers.

Zen teachers say that taking meals with ōryōki cultivates gratitude, mindfulness, and better understanding of self. (In this regard, it is not unlike zazen.) The intricacies of the form may require the practitioner to pay great attention to detail.

Meaning of Japanese word

According to Shohaku Okumura:

In Japanese, three Sino-Japanese characters comprise the word ōryōki:

応 ō, the receiver's response to the offering of food
量 ryō, a measure, or an amount, to be received
器 ki, the bowl.

References

External links
Photos of Oryoki
Translation of Dogen Zenji commentary on head cook
Translation of Dogen Zenji commentary on eating
White Wind Zen Community meal chant translation
Shambhala lineage use of Oryoki explained
Patrick Reynolds briefly explains and demonstrates Soto oryoki
Robin briefly explains and demonstrates oryoki as practiced in the Shambhala community

Zen
Zen art and culture
Buddhist cuisine
Buddhist ritual implements